Shyam Mukherjee may refer to:

 Shyam Mukherjee (politician)
 Shyam Mukherjee (filmmaker), editor of Surakshaa